Bulanık, formerly Gop or Kop, is a town and district in Muş Province, in the Eastern Anatolian region of Turkey.

History
In the 19th century Bulanık was the name of the kaza. Its capital, today's Bulanık town, was called Gop, also rendered as Kop. At the end of the 19th century Gop was described as a large village with about 400 houses, all but 50 of them inhabited by Armenians. Although the soil was amongst the most fertile in the region, the inhabitants were almost destitute due to the region's insecurity and the impossibility of exporting their crops. Two miles south of the village was an Armenian monastery named Surb Daniel which contained the relics of a saint of that name.

The district was formerly called Hark' and was part of Historical Armenia's Turuberan  province. The earliest record of Kop is found in the 995 encyclical from Vandir monastery under the name Koghb, which was later distorted.

Bulanık means "blurred" in Turkish which is a cite for Murat River.

After the Battle of Manzikert in 1071, Turkmen tribes (such as Bayat, Eymür and Bayındır) settled in Bulanık. Today, Kurds are the majority. Before the Armenian genocide, there was an Armenian majority, which was later replaced by Turks (in addition to local Turkmens). Bulanık took a lot of Turkic emigrants such as Meskhetians and Qarapapaq Turks. These Muhacirs first came with the Russo-Turkish War and continued to come during the Republic era). An American consul, Consul Tyrell, visited the border region between Bulanık and Eleşkirt and made these observations in the beginning of the 20th century:

The town's current mayor is Adnan Topçu of the Peoples' Democratic Party (HDP). Mehmet İlidi was appointed as the current district governor.

Economy
Historically, Bulanık was known for producing wheat and salt.

References

Populated places in Muş Province
Districts of Muş Province
Towns in Turkey
Kurdish settlements in Turkey